Marie-Rose Carême is a French professional football manager.

Career
Since 2010 he was a head coach of the ASC Le Geldar. From 2013 to 2018 he coached the French Guiana national football team together with Jaïr Karam.

References

External links

Year of birth missing (living people)
Living people
French football managers
French Guiana national football team managers
Place of birth missing (living people)
2017 CONCACAF Gold Cup managers